This article shows all participating team squads at the 2001 Men's NORCECA Volleyball Championship, held from September 21 to September 29, 2001 in Bridgetown, Barbados.

Head Coach: Ludger Niles

Head Coach: Stelio DeRocco

Head Coach: Gilberto Herrera Delgado

Head Coach: Beato Miguel Cruz

Head Coach: Marco Heredia

Head Coach: Douglas Beal

References
NORCECA 2001 (Archived 2009-05-28)

N
S